Modo may refer to:

Places 
 Modo, Lamongan, a district in East Java, Indonesia
 Modo, Ongjin County, Incheon, South Korea
 Modo, Jindo County, South Jeolla, South Korea

Other uses 
 MoDo, Mo och Domsjö AB, a Swedish industrial corporation (now merged with Holmen)
 Modo Hockey, a Swedish ice hockey club
 MODO, Magic: The Gathering Online, an online version of the collectible card game Magic: The Gathering
 MODO, the Museo del Objeto del Objeto is a design and communications museum in Mexico City founded it 2010
 modo (software), a polygon, subdivision surface, modeling and rendering package developed by Luxology, LLC
 Modo (wireless device), a wireless device developed by Scout electromedia
 Modo (car co-op), a carsharing co-op in Vancouver, BC, Canada
 Modo, a minor character in the Discworld novels
 Mo-Do (1966–2013), Italian Eurodance musician best known for the song "Eins, zwei, Polizei"
 Maureen Dowd (born 1952), New York Times columnist
 Michel Modo (1937–2008), French actor and humorist
 Modo, a protagonist from Biker Mice from Mars animated series

See also
 Modu, a defunct Israeli mobile phone company